Zahra Hatamnejad (born 14 September 1986) is an Iranian footballer who plays as a forward for Kowsar Women Football League club Palayesh Gaz Ilam. She has been a member of the senior Iran women's national team.

International goals

References 

1986 births
Living people
Iranian women's footballers
Iran women's international footballers
Women's association football forwards
People from Ilam Province
21st-century Iranian women